Teragra conspersa is a moth in the family Cossidae. It is found in South Africa.

References

Natural History Museum Lepidoptera generic names catalog

Endemic moths of South Africa
Metarbelinae
Moths described in 1855